Jesús Miguel García Gámez (born March 14, 1989) is a Mexican professional footballer who plays for Dorados de Sinaloa of Liga MX.

External links
 
 
 Jesús Miguel García Gámez at DoradosFC.com.mx 

1989 births
Living people
Mexican footballers
Association football goalkeepers
Dorados de Sinaloa footballers
Liga MX players
Ascenso MX players
Liga Premier de México players
People from Culiacán
Footballers from Sinaloa